A list of films released in Japan in 1951 (see 1951 in film).

See also
1951 in Japan

References

External links
Japanese films of 1951 at the Internet Movie Database

1951
Japanese
Films